The 1994 Arizona gubernatorial election took place on November 8, 1994, for the post of Governor of Arizona. Fife Symington, the incumbent Republican Governor of Arizona, defeated the Democratic nominee Eddie Basha to win a second term in office. However, Symington resigned in 1997 due to a federal indictment on corruption charges.

Republican primary
In the Republican primary, incumbent Governor Fife Symington was challenged by businesswoman Barbara Barrett, wife of business executive Craig Barrett. Symington announced his primary campaign by stating, "I vowed to get state spending under control, reduce taxes and do my best to promote economic development and restore strength to the economy. I think I am in a strong position because I accomplished my goals." Barrett spent more than $1 million of her own money in the attempt to defeat Symington, who she stated she did not dislike personally, but simply felt that she could do a better job as governor.

On September 13, 1994, Symington defeated Barrett in the primary by a margin of 68% to 32%. Political analysts stated that Barrett had failed to distinguish herself from the incumbent governor, and ran a flawed campaign.

Candidates
 Barbara Barrett, businesswoman
 Fife Symington, incumbent governor

Results

Democratic primary
In the Democratic primary, 1990 Democratic gubernatorial nominee and former Phoenix Mayor Terry Goddard attempted to seek the Democratic nomination once again, but was challenged by Paul Johnson, who was also a former Mayor of Phoenix, and Arizona Board of Regents member Eddie Basha, more famous for his involvement with the grocery store chain Bashas'. In the primary held on September 13, Basha defeated Goddard by a very small margin, with Johnson receiving a sizable level of support as well.

Candidates
 Eddie Basha, Arizona Board of Regents and businessman
 Terry Goddard, former Mayor of Phoenix and 1990 Democratic gubernatorial nominee
 Paul Johnson, former Mayor of Phoenix

Results

General election
Following the 1990 election, in which a run-off election was held in order to deter the possibility of a candidate winning with less than a plurality of all of the votes cast, as was the case with the 1986 election in which Evan Mecham was elected with only 39.96% of the vote, the 1994 election did not have a runoff. This was due to a measure that was approved by voters to eliminate the runoff system, which was marred by a longer than usual campaign and issues surrounding the date of when the runoff should be held.

Results

References

1994
1994 United States gubernatorial elections
Gubernatorial